Raymond "Ray" Campbell (born 4 April 1967) is a Northern Irish professional darts player who plays in Professional Darts Corporation events.

Campbell won a two-year PDC Tour Card on the third day of 2016 Q-School. He made his European Tour debut at the 2017 European Darts Open, losing 6–2 to John Henderson in the first round.

Campbell was only able to pick up £2,750 on the PDC Order of Merit over his two-year card and lost it after the 2017 season. Campbell attempted to regain his tour card at Q-School in 2018 and 2020.

References

External links

1967 births
Living people
Darts players from Northern Ireland
Professional Darts Corporation former tour card holders
British Darts Organisation players
Sportspeople from Belfast